Amalia of Neuenahr (6 April 1539 – 10 April 1602) was the daughter of Gumprecht of Neuenahr and Cordula of Holstein Schauenburg.

Her first husband was Hendrik van Brederode, who played an important part in the events leading up to the Eighty Years' War. After he became one of the leaders in the resistance against the Spanish Inquisition and Spanish rule in the Netherlands, she helped him collect funds. After his death in 1568, she married Frederick III, Elector Palatine of the Rhine in 1569. It was in the same year that Emilia, the second daughter of William the Silent and his second wife Anna of Saxony was named after her. This is because she was in charge of Anna's household at the time. Frederick died in 1576.

From 1579 until 1587 she was in charge of Vianen, which she inherited from her first husband. In 1589 she inherited Limburg from Adolf, her half-brother. In 1590 she was given the rights of use of Alpen, Helpenstein, Lennep and Erbvogtei of Köln by her half-sister, Magdalena. Alpen was occupied by the Dutch Republic in 1597 and the following year by Spanish forces.

References
"Women in Power" last accessed August 1, 2007

|-

Dutch people of the Eighty Years' War (United Provinces)
Electresses of the Palatinate
1539 births
1602 deaths
Burials at the Church of the Holy Spirit, Heidelberg